John Maher (born 1977) is an Irish hurler who played as a right corner-forward for the Kilkenny senior team.

Maher joined the team during the 2003 championship and was a regular member of the team for just three seasons. During that time he won one All-Ireland winners' medal as a non-playing substitute.

At club level Maher plays with St Martin's.

References

1977 births
Living people
Kilkenny inter-county hurlers
St Martin's (Kilkenny) hurlers